The Călmățuiul Sec is a left tributary of the river Călmățui in Romania. It flows into the Călmățui in Balta Sărată.

References

Rivers of Teleorman County
Rivers of Olt County
Rivers of Romania